Argentina competed at the 2012 Summer Olympics in London, United Kingdom, from 27 July to 12 August 2012. This was the nation's twenty-third appearance at the Summer Olympic Games, having missed only three editions: the 1904 Summer Olympics in St. Louis, the 1912 Summer Olympics in Stockholm, and the 1980 Summer Olympics in Moscow, because of its support for the United States-led boycott.

Comité Olímpico Argentino sent a total of 137 athletes to the Games, 96 men and 41 women, to compete in 22 sports. Archery, badminton, diving, football, modern pentathlon, water polo, weightlifting, rhythmic gymnastics and trampoline were the only sports in which Argentina had no representation in these Olympic Games. Among the sports, Argentina made its Olympic debut in synchronized swimming and men's handball. Luciana Aymar, captain of Argentina women's national field hockey team, who competed at her fourth Olympics, was the nation's flag bearer at the opening ceremony.

Argentina left London with a total of four medals (gold, silver, and two bronze). Sebastián Crismanich set a historic Olympic record, as he won its first ever gold medal in men's taekwondo, and the first by an individual athlete since 1948. Other notable accomplishments were the silver medal in field hockey for the women's team, and bronze medals in sailing and in men's tennis, the latter won by Juan Martín del Potro.

Medalists

Athletics

Argentine athletes achieved qualifying standards in the following athletics events (up to a maximum of 3 athletes in each event at the 'A' Standard, and 1 at the 'B' Standard):

Key
 Note–Ranks given for track events are within the athlete's heat only
 Q = Qualified for the next round
 q = Qualified for the next round as a fastest loser or, in field events, by position without achieving the qualifying target
 NR = National record
 N/A = Round not applicable for the event
 Bye = Athlete not required to compete in round
 NM = No mark

Men
Track & road events

Field events

Women
Track & road events

Field events

Basketball

Argentina qualified for the men's event.

Men's tournament

Roster

Group stage

Quarter-final

Semifinal

Bronze Medal Match

Boxing

Argentina qualified two boxers.

Men

Canoeing

Slalom
Argentina qualified boats for the following events

Sprint
Argentina qualified boats for the following events.

Qualification Legend: FA = Qualify to final (medal); FB = Qualify to final B (non-medal)

Cycling

Road

Track
Omnium

Mountain biking

BMX

Equestrian

Argentina qualified two riders

Jumping

Fencing

Argentina qualified 1 fencer.

Women

Field hockey

Argentina qualified for the men's and women's event

 Men's team event – 1 team of 16 players
 Women's team event – 1 team of 16 players

Men's tournament

Roster

Group play

Ninth and Tenth Place

Women's tournament

Group play

Semi-final

Final

Final rank
 Silver Medal

Gymnastics

Artistic
Men

Women

Handball

Argentina qualified for the men's event
 Men's team event – 1 team of 14 players

Men's tournament

Group play

Judo

Rowing

Argentina qualified the following boats.

Men

Women

Qualification Legend: FA=Final A (medal); FB=Final B (non-medal); FC=Final C (non-medal); FD=Final D (non-medal); FE=Final E (non-medal); FF=Final F (non-medal); SA/B=Semifinals A/B; SC/D=Semifinals C/D; SE/F=Semifinals E/F; QF=Quarterfinals; R=Repechage

Sailing

Argentina qualified 1 boat for each of the following events.

Men

Women

M = Medal race; EL = Eliminated – did not advance into the medal race;

Shooting

Two athletes qualified for shooting for the Argentine team.

Men

Swimming

Argentine swimmers achieved qualifying standards in the following events (up to a maximum of 2 swimmers in each event at the Olympic Qualifying Time (OQT), and potentially 1 at the Olympic Selection Time (OST)):

Men

Women

Synchronized swimming

Argentina qualified 1 duet in synchronized swimming.

Table tennis

Argentina qualified one table tennis player.

Taekwondo

Argentina qualified one man and one woman.

Tennis

Argentina qualified seven players.

Men

Women

Mixed

Triathlon

Volleyball

Beach

Indoor

Argentina qualified a team to the men's indoor tournament and a team to the women's beach tournament.

 Men's indoor event – 1 team of 12 players

Men's indoor tournament

Team roster

Group play

Quarter-final

Wrestling

Argentina qualified in the following events.

Key:
  - Victory by Fall.
  - Decision by Points – the loser with technical points.
  - Decision by Points – the loser without technical points.

Women's freestyle

See also
 Argentina at the 2011 Pan American Games
 Argentina at the 2012 Winter Youth Olympics

References

External links

2012 in Argentine sport
Nations at the 2012 Summer Olympics
2012